Yves Michaud (born July 11, 1944) is a French philosopher. As a student, he studied philosophy and science at École Normale Supérieure and the Sorbonne in Paris. His early research involved the study of political violence and empiricism, especially the works of John Locke and David Hume. He was Director of the École nationale supérieure des Beaux-Arts from 1989 to 1997. In 2000, Michaud partnered with Jean-Jacques Aillagon to establish the Université de tous les savoirs (University of all knowledge), a French government initiative to disseminate information on new scientific advances.

Michaud has published widely on the relationships of the arts and culture in a globalized, technological world. In 2007 Le Figaro published his article entitled "Ce nouveau fondamentalisme moral qui menace la société française".

Works by Michaud
 Violence et politique, 1978
 Hume et la fin de la philosophie, 1983 
 La Violence, PUF, coll. « Que sais-je ? », 1986
 Locke, 1986 ; réimpr. 1998
 Enseigner l'art ? : analyses et réflexions sur les écoles d'art, Nîmes, 1993
 La Crise de l'art contemporain, 1997 
 Changements dans la violence : essai sur la bienveillance et sur la peur, 2002
 Précis de recomposition politique : des incivismes à la française et de quelques manières d'y remédier, Paris, Climats, 2002, réimpr. 2006
 L'Art à l'état gazeux : essai sur le triomphe de l'esthétique, 2003
 Université de tous les savoirs : le renouvellement de l'observation dans les sciences, 2004
 Chirac dans le texte, la parole et l'impuissance, 2004
 Humain, inhumain, trop humain : réflexions philosophiques sur les biotechnologies, la vie et la conservation de soi à partir de l'œuvre de Peter Sloterdijk, Paris, Climats, 2006
 L'artiste et les commissaires : quatre essais non pas sur l'art contemporain mais sur ceux qui s'en occupent, Paris, Hachette, 2007
 Qu'est-ce que le mérite ?, Bourin éditeur, 2009
 Ibiza mon amour ; enquête sur l'industrialisation du plaisir, NiL editions, 2012
  Narcisse et ses avatars, Broché, 2014

Prizes and decorations
 Chevalier de la Légion d'honneur
 Ordre des Arts et des Lettres

See also
 Université de tous les savoirs

References

1944 births
Living people
École Normale Supérieure alumni
Academic staff of the University of Paris
French historians of philosophy
20th-century French philosophers
21st-century French philosophers
21st-century French writers
Chevaliers of the Légion d'honneur
Officiers of the Ordre des Arts et des Lettres
French male non-fiction writers